Matt Campbell (born 29 September 1989) is a Canadian professional darts player from Hamilton, Ontario. He is currently playing in the Professional Darts Corporation events.

Career
Campbell plays tournaments mainly in North America, in 2019 he won ADO Syracuse Open where he defeated Darin Young in the final. On CDC Pro Tour he finished as the best Canadian player and qualified for the 2020 PDC World Darts Championship. He played Mark McGeeney of England in the first round, but lost by three sets to one, averaging 88.33 in the match.
On CDC Pro Tour he finished as the best Canadian player and qualified for the 2021 PDC World Darts Championship.He played Scott Waites of England in the first round, but lost by three sets to two.
In 2021, he won three European Challenge Tour tournaments and topped the rankings, thus he earned a PDC Tour Card for 2022/2023, a place at the 2022 PDC World Darts Championship and a place at the 2021 Grand Slam of Darts. He played in Group F at the Grand Slam, losing all three matches (to Mensur Suljovic, José De Sousa and Luke Humphries), finishing last in his group.

He faced Adrian Lewis in the first round of 2022 PDC World Darts Championship. Campbell won the first set, but eventually lost 1-3 and was eliminated.

World Championship results

PDC
 2020: First round (lost to Mark McGeeney 1–3) 
 2021: First round (lost to Scott Waites 2–3)
 2022: First round (lost to Adrian Lewis 1–3)
 2023: First round (lost to Danny Baggish 0–3)

Performance timeline
PDC

PDC European Tour

References

External links

1989 births
Professional Darts Corporation current tour card holders
Canadian darts players
Living people
Sportspeople from Hamilton, Ontario
PDC World Cup of Darts Canadian team